Leonardo Daniel Franco Hernández (born 28 May 1995) is a Mexican professional footballer who plays as a midfielder for Pioneros de Cancún.

References

External links
 

1995 births
Living people
Association football midfielders
Correcaminos UAT footballers
Irapuato F.C. footballers
Pioneros de Cancún footballers
Liga MX players
Ascenso MX players
Liga Premier de México players
Tercera División de México players
Footballers from Tamaulipas
People from Ciudad Victoria
Mexican footballers